James Hurd Hughes (January 14, 1867 – August 29, 1953) was an American lawyer and politician from Dover, in Kent County, Delaware. He was a member of the Democratic Party who served as U.S. Senator from Delaware.

Early life and family
Hughes was born in Kent County, Delaware, near Felton, the son of Rebecca (Hurd) and Ebenezer Hughes. He attended the Collegiate Institute in Dover, taught school for a few years, studied law, and was admitted to the Delaware Bar in 1890. Along with his law practice, he was engaged in agricultural pursuits and banking.

Political career

Hughes served as the Delaware Secretary of State from 1897 until 1901. He ran for governor of Delaware in 1916 but was defeated by Republican John G. Townsend, Jr., a businessman from Selbyville, Delaware. Twenty years later, in 1936 he was elected to the U. S. Senate, defeating incumbent Republican U. S. Senator Daniel O. Hastings. During this term, he served with the Democratic majority in the 75th, 76th, and 77th Congress.

Hughes lost his bid for a second term in 1942, losing the Democratic Party nomination to E. Ennalls Berl. In all, he served from January 3, 1937, until January 2, 1943, during the administration of U.S. President Franklin D. Roosevelt. After completing his term in the Senate, he returned to the practice of law. All the while, from 1905 until his death, he was a director of the Farmers' Bank of Delaware.

Death and legacy
Hughes was married to Caroline Taylor. Their great-granddaughter is actress Perrey Reeves.

Hughes died at Lewes and is buried in the Lakeside Methodist Episcopal Cemetery at Dover.

His home, Wheel of Fortune, was added to the National Register of Historic Places in 1973.

Almanac
Elections are held the first Tuesday after November 1. U.S. Senators are popularly elected and take office January 3 for a six-year term.

References

Images
Biographical Directory of the United States Congress

External links
 
Biographical Directory of the United States Congress
Delaware’s Members of Congress 

The Political Graveyard 

 

1867 births
1953 deaths
People from Dover, Delaware
Delaware lawyers
Delaware Democrats
Secretaries of State of Delaware
Democratic Party United States senators from Delaware
Burials in Dover, Delaware
People from Kent County, Delaware